Jan Tarło (died 1550) was a Polish nobleman (szlachcic).

Jan was Krajczy of the Crown since 1522, Podczaszy of the Crown since 1546, Cześnik of the Crown since 1550 and starost of Pilzno.

15th-century births
1550 deaths
Jan XV-1550